was an American astronaut, engineer, and USAF Flight test engineer from Kealakekua, Hawaii, who successfully flew into space with the Space Shuttle Discovery on STS-51-C. He died in the destruction of the Space Shuttle Challenger, on which he was serving as Mission Specialist for mission STS-51-L. He was the first Asian American and the first person of Japanese origin to reach space.

Early life
Born on June 24, 1946, Onizuka was the oldest son and second-youngest child of Masamitsu and Mitsue Onizuka. He was a Buddhist. He had two older sisters, Shirley and Norma, and a younger brother, Claude, who became the family spokesman after the Challenger disaster. Growing up, Ellison was an active participant in FFA, 4-H, and the Boy Scouts of America, where he reached the level of Eagle Scout.

Onizuka graduated from Konawaena High School in 1964.  He received a Bachelor of Science degree in Aerospace Engineering in June 1969, and a Master of Science degree in that field in December of the same year, from the University of Colorado at Boulder. He participated in U.S. Air Force ROTC during his time there and is an alumnus of Triangle Fraternity, as well as a member of the Tau Beta Pi honor society.

Onizuka married Lorna Leiko Yoshida on June 7, 1969, while completing his studies at the University of Colorado. They had two daughters, Janelle Onizuka-Gillilan (b. 1969) and Darien Lei Shizue Onizuka-Morgan (b. 1975).

Air Force career
On January 15, 1970, Onizuka entered active duty with the United States Air Force, where he served as a flight test engineer at Sacramento Air Logistics Center at McClellan Air Force Base. He worked in test flight programs and systems security engineering for the F-84, F-100, F-105, F-111, EC-121T, T-33, T-39, T-28, and A-1.

From August 1974 to July 1975, Onizuka attended the U.S. Air Force Test Pilot School. In July 1975, he was assigned to the Flight Test Center at Edwards Air Force Base in California. He became a squadron flight test engineer at the USAF Test Pilot School, and later worked as a manager for engineering support in the training resources division. His duties there consisted of course instruction and management of the airship fleet (A-7, A-37, T-38, F-4, T-33, and NKC-135) being used for the Test Pilot School and Flight Test Center. While at the school, he registered more than 1,700 flight hours.

NASA career
Onizuka was selected for the astronaut program in January 1978 and completed one year of evaluation and training in August 1979. Later, he worked in the experimentation team, Orbiter test team, and launch support crew at Kennedy Space Center for the STS-1 and STS-2. At NASA, he worked on the Shuttle Avionics Integration Laboratory (SAIL) test and revision software team.

Onizuka's first space mission took place on January 24, 1985, with the launch of mission STS 51-C on Space Shuttle Discovery, the first Space Shuttle mission for the Department of Defense. He was accompanied by Commander Ken Mattingly, Pilot Loren Shriver, fellow Mission Specialist James Buchli, and Payload Specialist Gary E. Payton. During the mission, he was responsible for the activities of the primary payloads, which included the unfolding of the Inertial Upper Stage (IUS) surface. After 48 orbits around the Earth, Discovery landed at Kennedy Space Center on January 27, 1985. He had completed a total of 74 hours in space.

Onizuka was assigned to the mission STS 51-L on the Space Shuttle Challenger that took off from Kennedy Space Center at 11:38:00 EST (16:38:00 UTC) on January 28, 1986. The other Challenger crew members were commander Dick Scobee, pilot Michael J. Smith, mission specialists Ronald McNair, Judith Resnik, and payload specialists Gregory Jarvis and Christa McAuliffe. The shuttle was destroyed when a flame jet leaking from a solid rocket booster ruptured the liquid hydrogen fuel tank 73 seconds after launch. All seven crew members were killed.

Following the Challenger disaster, examination of the recovered vehicle cockpit revealed that three of the crew members' Personal Egress Air Packs were activated: those of Onizuka, mission specialist Judith Resnik, and pilot Michael Smith. The location of Smith's activation switch, on the back side of his seat, means that either Resnik or Onizuka could have activated it for him. This is the only evidence available from the disaster that shows Onizuka and Resnik were alive after the cockpit separated from the vehicle. However, if the cabin had lost pressure, the packs alone would not have sustained the crew during the two-minute descent.

Onizuka was buried at the National Memorial Cemetery of the Pacific in Honolulu, Hawaii. At the time of his death, he held the rank of lieutenant colonel. Posthumously, he was promoted to the rank of colonel.

Memberships and distinctions
Onizuka belonged to the following organizations: Society of Flight Test Engineers, the Air Force Association, the American Institute of Aeronautics and Astronautics, Tau Beta Pi, Sigma Tau, Arnold Air Society, and Triangle Fraternity.

Among his distinctions are the Air Force Meritorious Service Medal, Air Force Commendation Medal, Air Force Outstanding Unit Award, Air Force Organizational Excellence Award, National Defense Service Medal, Air Force Longevity Award, and NASA Space Flight Medal. He was posthumously awarded the Congressional Space Medal of Honor.

Legacy

Onizuka Air Force Station in Sunnyvale, California and Onizuka Village family housing on Hickam Air Force Base are dedicated to him.

The Ellison S. Onizuka Space Center at Kona International Airport in the Kona district of Hawaii island where he was born and raised, was dedicated to him. The center closed in March 2016 and was unable to find a suitable location to reopen. Select items from the center's collection have been put on permanent display at the Japanese Cultural Center of Hawaii in Moiliili on the island of Oahu. They not only feature Onizuka's personal items, but also the only Moon rock in Hawaii and the space suit from Apollo 13 astronaut Fred Haise.

Two astronomical features were also named after him: an asteroid discovered by Edward L. G. Bowell on February 8, 1984, 3355 Onizuka and a 29-km-diameter crater on the Moon, Onizuka.

The Cygnus NG-16 ISS resupply spacecraft was named after Onizuka (S.S. Ellison Onizuka).

Little Tokyo in Los Angeles, California also has a street named after him, as does the street surrounding Whitcomb Elementary school in Clear Lake City, Houston, Texas, where his daughters attended. It also named its library the Onizuka Memorial Library. (At the time of the Challenger disaster, his older daughter, Janelle, attended Clear Lake High School. His younger daughter, Darien Lei, was at Whitcomb.) In addition, Onizuka Street in Little Tokyo has a scale replica of the Challenger as a memorial, and a permanent memorial to Onizuka is located in the lobby of the Hompa Hongwanji Buddhist Temple.

The Onizuka Center for International Astronomy, named in Onizuka's honor, is the mid-level support and visitor complex for the Mauna Kea Observatories in Hawaii. It includes a Visitor Information Station as well as dining, lodging, office, and maintenance facilities for observatory staff and astronomers. A plaque of his face is mounted on a boulder by the entrance to the Visitor Information Station. 
Triangle Fraternity has the Ellison Onizuka Young Alumnus Award in tribute to him.

The Ann & H.J. Smead Aerospace Engineering Sciences building at the University of Colorado at Boulder features a conference room named after him on the third floor.

The Arnold Air Society Squadron attached to the 105th Air Force ROTC Detachment at the University of Colorado at Boulder bears Onizuka's name.

Page 28 (Page X of additional page inserts, or page 52 of the extended length version) of every new standard U.S. passport contains this quotation: "Every generation has the obligation to free men's minds for a look at new worlds... to look out from a higher plateau than the last generation." - Ellison Onizuka

The Hawaii Space Grant Consortium holds an annual Astronaut Ellison Onizuka Science Day at the University of Hawai'i-Hilo for students in grades 4–12, parents and teachers. El Camino College in Torrance, California hosts an annual Onizuka Space Science Day, jointly organized by the Onizuka Memorial Committee.

The students at the United States Air Force Test Pilot School present the Onizuka Prop Wash Award to the classmate who contributed most to class spirit and morale.

On January 1, 2017, the airport in his home district of Kona was renamed Ellison Onizuka Kona International Airport at Keāhole.

Clear Lake High School, where Ellison's children went to school, has on display a soccer ball that was on board the Challenger during the accident. It was given to Ellison on behalf of the soccer team that he coached, and for which his children played, to be brought into space. The ball was retrieved during the recovery efforts and donated to the school. In 2016, Col. Robert Kimbrough on Expedition 49/50 brought the ball into space.

A Cygnus resupply vehicle on ISS resupply mission Cygnus NG-16 was named the SS Ellison Onizuka in his honor. It launched on August 10, 2021, and arrived at the ISS on August 12.

In media
 Onizuka was portrayed by Keone Young in the 1990 TV movie Challenger.
 In Star Trek: The Next Generation, a shuttlecraft carried aboard the starship Enterprise bears Onizuka's name, as seen in the three episodes "The Ensigns of Command", "The Mind's Eye" and "The Outcast."

See also

 List of Asian American astronauts

References

Sources
This article draws heavily on the corresponding article in the Spanish-language Wikipedia, which was accessed in the version of July 8, 2005.

External links

 
 Astronaut Memorial Foundation website

1946 births
1986 deaths
Accidental deaths in Florida
United States Air Force astronauts
American Buddhists
United States Air Force officers
People from Hawaii (island)
Military personnel from Hawaii
University of Colorado alumni
20th-century American engineers
American military personnel of Japanese descent
U.S. Air Force Test Pilot School alumni
American test pilots
Space Shuttle program astronauts
Space Shuttle Challenger disaster
Space Shuttle Challenger disaster victims
Recipients of the Congressional Space Medal of Honor
Triangle Fraternity
Aviators from Hawaii
American aviators of Asian descent
Burials in the National Memorial Cemetery of the Pacific